Zarya (Dawn) was a monthly literary and political Russian magazine published in Saint Petersburg in 1869-1872.

A Slavophile-oriented journal, Zarya supported the liberal reforms in Russia while promoting the idea of strong Tsarist power. Nikolai Danilevsky's Russia and Europe, published there in 1869 (Nos. 1-6, 8-10) would later become the basis for Alexander III's government's official political doctrine. Among other notable works that were published by Zarya were "The Prisoner of the Caucasus" by Leo Tolstoy (1872, No. 2), The Eternal Husband by Fyodor Dostoyevsky, as well as assorted works by Fyodor Tyutchev, Afanasy Fet, Apollon Maykov, Yakov Polonsky, Alexey Pisemsky, Konstantin Leontyev, Dmitry Averkiyev, Vsevolod Krestovsky, Viktor Klyushnikov, Daniil Mordovtsev, Vasily Avseenko, Semyon Sholkovich. A pivotal figure in Zarya was the critic and journalist Nikolai Strakhov. His  three essays on Tolstoy's War and Peace (1869, Nos. 1 and 2; 1870, No.1) provided the first detailed analysis on this novel in Russia.

The magazine's editor-in-chief Vasily Kashpiryov was also its publisher. After three years of struggling to attract the wider readership, he found himself on the verge of bankruptcy and stopped the publication in February 1872.

References 

1869 establishments in the Russian Empire
Defunct literary magazines published in Europe
Defunct magazines published in Russia
Magazines established in 1869
Magazines disestablished in 1872
Magazines published in Saint Petersburg
Literary magazines published in Russia
Russian-language magazines
Monthly magazines published in Russia